Kim Ian Parker (born 1956) is a Canadian religious studies scholar, who serves as a professor at Memorial University of Newfoundland.
He is known for his research on the Bible and the works of John Locke.
Parker has held various grants from the Social Sciences and Humanities Research Council.

Books
 An Introduction to the Hebrew Bible/Old Testament, Linus Publications, 2014
 The Biblical Politics of John Locke, Wilfrid Laurier University Press, 2004
 Wisdom and Law in the Reign of Solomon, Lewiston, New York: Edwin Mellen Press, 1994
 Liberal Democracy and the Bible (ed.), Lewiston, New York: Edwin Mellen Press, 1993
 Text and Tradition: A Guide to the Old Testament, Trinity Press, 1990

References

External links
Kim Ian Parker at Memorial University of Newfoundland

Living people
1956 births
Academic staff of the Memorial University of Newfoundland
Philosophers of religion
Canadian Christian theologians
Religious studies scholars
McMaster University alumni
Locke scholars
Political philosophers
Hermeneutists